Trombonist Peter Ellefson is Professor of Music at Indiana University's Jacobs School of Music, having been a faculty member since 2002 and Chair of the Brass Department since 2014.

Education
Ellefson is from Myrtle Creek, Oregon and is the youngest son of music educator, Wendell Ellefson (deceased 1994). A 1980 graduate of South Umpqua High School, Ellefson attended and graduated with honors in 1984, from Linfield College in McMinnville, Oregon, where he was honored as the Most Outstanding Alumni of 2012. He received his master's degree in 1985 from Northwestern University and began doctoral study at Indiana University in 1991. His primary teachers have been Warren Baker, Mark Lawrence, Frank Crisafulli, M. Dee Stewart and Joseph Alessi.

Career
Ellefson has been a frequent guest musician with the Boston Symphony, the Chicago Symphony and the New York Philharmonic. From 1992-2002 he was a member of the Seattle Symphony, where he participated in dozens of recordings, performing on trombone, euphonium and bass trumpet. He was the principal trombone for many of Seattle Opera's productions of Richard Wagner's Der Ring Des Nibelungen. While in Seattle he also participated in hundreds of recording sessions for film, television and video game soundtracks. Peter Ellefson has released three solo recordings. In 2010, he released his first solo recording titled Pura Vida on the Summit Records label. In 2017, he released À la Manière de Defaye and in 2019, his most recent, “3.” He has also recorded with the Chicago Symphony, CSO Brass, Cincinnati Pops, New York Philharmonic and Oregon Symphony. He is on the faculty of the Alessi Seminar and has taught at Northwestern University, Roosevelt University, University of Costa Rica and the Music Academy of the West.

Contributions
Ellefson has authored articles on Wagner and Bruckner in the Journal of the International Trombone Association and in the Brass Player's Cookbook.

Personal
Ellefson is married to Deborah Rutter, President of the John F. Kennedy Center for the Performing Arts in Washington, D.C

References

External links

Living people
Indiana University faculty
Year of birth missing (living people)
Linfield University alumni
People from Myrtle Creek, Oregon
Bienen School of Music alumni
Indiana University alumni